This article describes the energy and electricity production, consumption and import in Egypt.

Overview

Electricity

Petroleum

Crude oil

Egypt has the sixth-largest proved oil reserves in Africa. Over half of these reserves are offshore reserves. Although Egypt is not a member of OPEC, it is a member of the Organization of Arab Petroleum Exporting Countries.

The National oil company is the Egyptian General Petroleum Corporation.

Egypt is estimated to hold  initial recoverable liquid reserves. After decades of production, it is estimated that the country has approximately  recoverable oil remaining, as of January 2011. These figures indicate that 83% of Egypt's recoverable oil reserves have been depleted.

Shale oil
The 1000 to 2000 foot thick and organically rich, total organic content of about 4%, Khatatba Formation in the Western Desert is the source rock for wells there and is a potential source for shale oil and shale gas. Apache Corporation, using substantial assets acquired in 2010 from BP after the Deepwater Horizon disaster, is the major operator in the Western Desert, often in joint ventures with Egyptian General Petroleum Corporation (EGPC) such as Khalda Petroleum Company and Qarun Petroleum Company. In 1996 Apache merged with Phoenix Resources, which had made the Qarun discovery in 1994, and took over operations of the Qarun Concession in Egypt. Apache has developed about 18% of the 10 million acres it controls, in 2012 running a score of rigs; drilling about 200 development and injection wells; and about 50 exploration wells with a success rate of about 55%. Plans for 2013 included an investment of about $1 billion in development and exploration. On 29 August 2013 Apache announced sale of a 1/3 share of its Egyptian assets to Sinopec for $3.1 billion effective 1 January 2014; Apache would continue to be the operator.

Oil shale
Oil shale resources were red in the Safaga-Quseir area of the Eastern Desert in the 1940s. The oil shale in the Red Sea area could be extracted by underground mining. In the Abu Tartour are, oil shale be mined as byproduct whilst mining for phosphates. Oil shale in Egypt is foreseen as a potential fuel for the power generation.

Natural gas

Natural gas is exported by the Arab Gas Pipeline to the Middle East and in the future potentially to Europe. Natural gas is also exported as liquefied natural gas (LNG), produced at the plants of Egyptian LNG and SEGAS LNG. BP and Eni, the Italian oil and gas company, together with Gas Natural Fenosa of Spain, built major liquefied natural gas facilities in Egypt for the export market, but the plants were largely idled as domestic gas consumption has soared.

In March 2015, BP signed a $12 billion deal to develop natural gas in Egypt intended for sale in the domestic market starting in 2017. BP said it would develop a large quantity of offshore gas, equivalent to about one-quarter of Egypt's output, and bring it onshore for domestic consumers. Gas from the project, called West Nile Delta, was expected to begin flowing in 2017. BP said that additional exploration might double the amount of gas available.

In September 2015, Eni announced the discovery of the Zohr gas field, largest in the Mediterranean. The field was estimated at 30 trillion cubic feet (850×109 m³) of total gas in place.

Dolphinus Holdings Ltd provides gas from Israeli fields to Egypt. In November 2019, Egypt signed a number of energy deals at a conference, including a $430-million deal for Texas-based Noble Energy to pump natural gas through the East Mediterranean Gas Co's pipeline.

Nuclear power

Egypt has been considering the use of nuclear energy for decades: in 1964, a 150 MWe and in 1974 a 600 MWe, nuclear power stations were proposed. The Nuclear Power Plants Authority (NPPA) was established in 1976, and in 1983 the El Dabaa site on the Mediterranean coast was selected. Egypt's nuclear plans, however, were shelved after the Chernobyl accident. In 2006, Egypt announced it would revive its civilian nuclear power programme, and build a 1,000 MW nuclear power station at El Dabaa. Its estimated cost at the time was US$1.5bn, and the plans were to do the construction with the help of foreign investors. In March 2008, Egypt signed an agreement with Russia on the peaceful uses of nuclear energy. In 2015, contracts were signed with a Russian company to begin the building of the plant at El Dabaa.

Renewable energy
The energy strategy in Egypt adopted by the Supreme Council of Energy in February 2008 is to increase renewable energy generation up to 20% of the total mix by 2020.

Hydropower

The majority of Egypt's electricity supply is generated from thermal and hydropower stations. The four main hydroelectric generating stations currently operating in Egypt are the Aswan Low Dam, the Esna Dam, the Aswan High Dam, and the Naga Hamady Barrages. The Asyut Barrage hydropower plant is scheduled to be commissioned and added as a fifth station in 2016.

Almost all hydroelectric generation in Egypt comes from the Aswan High Dam. The Aswan High Dam has a theoretical generating capacity of 2.1GW; however, the dam is rarely able to operate at full design capacity due to low water levels. An ongoing refurbishment program is being enacted to not only increase the generating capacity of the dam to 2.4GW, but also extend the operational life of the turbines by about 40 years.

In 2011, Egypt produced 156.6 TWh gross, of which 12.9 TWh came from hydroelectric generation. The per capita consumption of electricity at the end of 2012 was 1910 kWh/yr, while Egypt's hydropower potential in 2012 was about 3,664 MW. As of 2009–2013, hydropower made up about 12% of Egypt's total installed power generation capacity – a small decline from 2006 to 2007 when hydropower made up about 12.8%. The percentage of hydropower energy is steadily declining due to all major conventional hydropower sites already having been developed with a limited potential for further increase in generating capacity. Outside of the Aswan High Dam, the other hydropower sites are considered very modest and most new generation plants being built in Egypt are based on fossil fuels.

Even with the addition of the Asyut Barrage hydropower plant in 2016, hydropower development in Egypt is still lagging as the existing and developed hydropower plants are no longer being constructed at a rate that can support the increasing electricity consumption in Egypt. The population of Egypt has increased by 14.3% in the five-year period from 2004 to 2009 (OECD/World Bank). Every six months there are 1 million more Egyptians. Energy production grew by 36% between 2004 and 2009.

The only remaining significant hydropower site that is currently undeveloped is the Qattara Depression. Several schemes have been proposed through the years to implement a Qattara Depression Project. None of which have been executed due to prohibitive capital costs and technical difficulties. Depending on the generating scheme chosen the Qattara Depression could potentially generate anywhere from 670MW to 6800MW.

Solar
Egypt has a high solar availability as a result of its hot desert climate. The total capacity of installed photovoltaic systems is about 4.5 MWp. They are used in remote areas for water pumping, desalination, rural clinics, telecommunications, rural village electrification, etc. The proposed large-scale solar power project Desertec also involves Egypt.

In some areas, the country receives over 4,000 hours of sunshine per year, which is among the highest quantities registered in the world. Due to the sharp population growth and a series of blackouts during the summer caused by a supply shortage, Egyptian demand for solar energy is increasing. However, only 1% of the electricity is produced by solar energy. The majority of solar energy available in the country derives from small-scale projects. Modestly-sized projects, up to 10 MW, are constituted by hybrid solar/diesel solutions, which are developed by the Emirati company Masdar.

In 2019 Egypt completed one of the biggest solar installations in the world, Benban Solar Park, which generates 1.8 GW to power 1 million homes.

In 2021, Egypt signed contracts worth $700 million with the Kom Ombo Solar Energy Complex which would create 10,000 jobs. The contracts include 32 solar energy projects.

Wind

Egypt has a high potential for wind energy, especially in the Red Sea coast area. As of 2021, 1640 MW of wind energy was installed.

See also 
 Ministry of Electricity and Energy (Egypt)
 Renewable energy by country
 Waste management in Egypt

References

Citations